Solicitor General was launched in Bermuda in 1785. She came to England circa 1794 and first sailed as a West Indiaman but then new owners in 1795 employed her as a slave ship in the triangular trade in enslaved people. She was wrecked on the coast of North Africa on her first voyage on her way to acquire captives. Her crew were themselves enslaved, not being freed until mid-1797.

Career
Solicitor General first appeared in Lloyd's Register (LR) in 1794.

In August 1794 Lloyd's List reported that Solicitor General was sailing from Antigua to Liverpool when she had put into St Kitts in a leaky condition.

Captain Thomas Smith sailed from Liverpool on 17 July 1795.

Solicitor General was lost on the Barbary Coast on 11 August 1795. She was on a voyage from Liverpool to Africa. Her 19 crew members survived, but were enslaved by the locals. Smith and his crew were finally freed circa July 1797. There they worked “all day in the sun”. 

Seventeen ninety-five was the worst year in the period 1793–1807 for losses among British slave ships. Fifty vessels were lost that year, 40 of them on the coast of Africa, and three Africa-bound from British ports. Because she had not yet arrived on the slave coast of Africa, Solicitor General might have been classified as one of the three.

Citations

References
 
 
 
 

1785 ships
Ships built in Bermuda
Age of Sail merchant ships of England
Liverpool slave ships
Maritime incidents in 1795